Eudonia hemiplaca is a moth in the family Crambidae. It was described by Edward Meyrick in 1899. It is endemic to New Zealand.

The wingspan is about 18 mm. The forewings are dark fuscous with purplish reflections. There is an obscure line on the lower half which is slightly paler than the ground-colour, as well as a suboblong white blotch which is sprinkled with fuscous and margined by black suffusion. There is second line, which is also slightly paler than the ground-colour. This line is darker-margined and forms a whitish dot on the costa. The hindwings are pale grey with indications of a faint paler postmedian line.

Larvae have been recorded feeding on mosses.

References

Moths described in 1899
Eudonia
Endemic fauna of New Zealand
Moths of New Zealand
Taxa named by Edward Meyrick
Endemic moths of New Zealand